Disk aggregation is the abstraction of two or more hard disks, disk partitions, or other logical volumes into a single logical disk.

This is done to:

 create a single logical disk with a capacity larger than any of the available physical disks
 provide a simple way to increase disk performance 
 provide a simple way to implement LUN-level storage virtualization

See also
 RAID
 Storage virtualization

References 

Storage virtualization